Prince George County Courthouse Historic District is a county courthouse complex and national historic district located at Prince George, Prince George County, Virginia.  The district includes 11 contributing buildings and 3 contributing objects.  They include the 1883 courthouse, 1900 clerk's office, the jail dated to about 1900, and three mid 20th century Colonial Revival-style office buildings. A Craftsman-style dwelling was adapted for office use and added to the courts complex in the 1970s. The courthouse green includes memorials commemorating the Civil War, World Wars I and II, and the Korean and Vietnam Wars.  Also included in the district are the F.L. Buren Store (c. 1870), the Victorian-style Buren residence (c. 1870), and two contributing outbuildings.

It was listed on the National Register of Historic Places in 2003.

References

Courthouses on the National Register of Historic Places in Virginia
County courthouses in Virginia
Colonial Revival architecture in Virginia
Historic districts on the National Register of Historic Places in Virginia
Buildings and structures in Prince George County, Virginia
National Register of Historic Places in Prince George County, Virginia